The Spanish Prisoner is a confidence trick originating by at least the early 19th century, as Eugène François Vidocq described in his memoirs.

The scam

In its original form, the confidence trickster tells his victim (the mark) that he is (or is in correspondence with) a wealthy person of high estate who has been imprisoned in Spain under a false identity. Some versions had the imprisoned person being an unknown or remote relative of the mark. Supposedly the prisoner cannot reveal his identity without serious repercussions, and is relying on a friend (the trickster) to raise money to secure his release. In this classic pigeon drop game archetype, the trickster offers to let the mark put up some of the funds, with a promise of a greater monetary reward upon release of the prisoner, and sometimes the additional reward of marrying a beautiful woman stated to be the prisoner's daughter. After the mark has turned over the funds, he is informed further difficulties have arisen, and more money is needed. With such explanations, the trickster continues to press for more money until the victim is cleaned out, or declines to put up more funds.

Characteristics
Key features of the Spanish Prisoner trick are the emphasis on secrecy and the trust the trickster apparently places in the mark not to reveal the prisoner's identity or situation. The trickster will typically claim to have chosen the mark carefully, based on his reputation for honesty and straight dealing, and may appear to structure the deal so that the trickster's ultimate share of the reward will be distributed voluntarily by the mark.

Modern variants
Modern variants of the Spanish Prisoner fraud include the advance-fee scam, in particular the Nigerian money transfer (or 419) scam.

References

External links

Advance fee fraud at Metropolitan Police Service
Fraud Letters Flood State (February 13, 1910), Minneapolis Tribune
Examples of Spanish Prisoner letters
The Spanish Prisoner, original story by Arthur Train

Confidence tricks
Nonexistent people used in hoaxes
Fictional Spanish people
Penal system in Spain